Vival,  sometimes referred to as Vival by CASINO, and Vival, viva la vie, is a brand of local grocery shops run by Groupe Casino.
Vival can also sometimes be found at petrol stations, such as in the Aire de service des Haras on the A28 motorway in Normandy.

Main concept
The concept of Vival is a shop that is in between a locally run store, and a small supermarket that is run by a chain. The result is Vival, a small local chain of shops, in rural areas.

Retail companies of France
Groupe Casino